The Holdong mine(홀동광산) is one of the largest gold mines in North Korea and in the world. The mine is located in the south of the country in Yonsan County,North Hwanghae Province. The mine has estimated reserves of 63.2 million oz of gold and 149.8 million oz of silver. The mine also has reserves amounting to 520 million tonnes of ore grading 0.35% copper metal and 266 million tonnes of ore grading 26% iron metal.

References 

Gold mines in North Korea
Copper mines in North Korea
Silver mines in North Korea
Iron mines in North Korea